Kid Nation is an American reality television show hosted by Jonathan Karsh that premiered on the CBS network on September 19, 2007 created by Tom Forman Productions and Endemol USA. The program was originally scheduled to air in mid-2007.

In the show, the children try to create a functioning society in the town, including setting up a government system with minimal adult help and supervision.

On May 14, 2008, CBS officially canceled the series after one season.

In 2020, the series generated a renewed interest with mixed reviews as many YouTube members independently reviewed, discussed, and commented on each of the thirteen original episodes.  It has since become a cult TV series.  In addition, many former members of the show gave interviews and commentary of their own during that time.

Synopsis
The show, featuring 40 children and adolescents aged 8 to 15, was filmed on location at the Bonanza Creek Movie Ranch, a privately owned town built on the ruins of Bonanza City, New Mexico, 13 miles south of Santa Fe.

The show stresses the difficulty in creating a viable society. While each child received $5,000  for their involvement, Gold Stars valued at $20,000 and $50,000 were awarded to select outstanding participants as decided by the elected Town Council.

Speaking before an audience of television reviewers, producer Tom Forman acknowledged that Kid Nation would inevitably share some elements with William Golding's novel Lord of the Flies, which depicted planewrecked children without adult supervision. Adults were present off-camera during production, including cameramen, producers, a medic, and a child psychologist, although all interacted with the children as little as possible. Participants also missed a month of school, but Forman suggested that such real-world tasks as preparing a group breakfast, doing physical chores like fetching water, and making group decisions constituted an educational experience in its own right. Forman said that all participants were cleared by a team of psychologists and any child could choose to go home during any of the periodical town meetings, which three did.

Episodes

These gold stars were worth $50,000 and were awarded at the final town hall meeting.

Participants

The participants of Kid Nation consist of 40 kids, whose ages ranged from 8 to 15. The following table lists each child's district color (including change if applicable), age at the onset of the show, home state, the terms they held in Town Council, the day they received a gold star, when they left Bonanza City and any applicable notes.

 Original district
 Final district color or black, with N/A (Not Applicable) if participant left the show
 These gold stars were worth $50,000 and were awarded at the final town hall meeting.

Reception

Pre-premiere
Ahead of its premiere, the show proved to be the most controversial of the upcoming fall 2007 season, even though the only actual footage seen was a four-minute promo running on television and the Web. In previewing the series, CBS eschewed television critics, instead holding screenings at schools in at least seven large cities. Variety columnist Brian Lowry wrote that "Kid Nation is only the latest program to use kids as fodder for fun and profit, which doesn't make the trend any less disturbing." William Coleman, a professor of pediatrics at the University of North Carolina, argued that the younger children, ages 8 to 12, might not be able to deal with the stress, yet could be enticed to participate by the potential fame or be pressured to do so by a parent.

Los Angeles Times reporter Maria Elena Fernandez interviewed four of the children, who told her they had worked harder than they ever had in their lives but would willingly repeat the experience. They said the most challenging aspect was getting used to being filmed constantly.

Post-premiere
After the show's premiere, many television critics wrote negative reviews, with Los Angeles Times critic Robert Lloyd a notable exception. Reviewing the first episode, Washington Post columnist Tom Shales suggested that the show is "not so much an exercise in socialization as the indoctrination of children into a consumer culture". Shales pointed out that the kids' decisions included buying root beer at the saloon with "real money", but not hiring or being hired—as their money was "parceled out to them according to their predetermined stations in life."

By the third episode, some advertisers that had shied away from Kid Nation due to its initial controversy had begun to purchase time.

Reflecting near the end of the season, Los Angeles Times writer Maria Elena Fernandez, who had reported extensively on Kid Nation, wrote that neither the show's pre-premiere promises nor controversies quite congealed: the children were never as autonomous or self-reliant as the publicity indicated and the threatened legal investigations by the state of New Mexico never took off. As the series concluded, low ratings had cast doubt on whether CBS would renew the show. Brad Adgate, an analyst with Horizon Media, said the chances were not good unless a writers' strike, ongoing at the time of the season finale, increased demand for more reality shows.

Time magazine's James Poniewozik named it one of the Top 10 New TV Series of 2007, ranking it at #10.

It was nominated for Best Family Television Reality Show, Game Show or Documentary at the 29th Annual Young Artist Awards.

U.S. Nielsen ratings

Treatment of children and broader legal implications
Kid Nation raised questions about the appropriate minimum age of participants in reality shows. As with most other reality shows, the children were signed on contracts requiring them to be available for filming for 24 hours a day through the 40-day filming period. The federal Fair Labor Standards Act of 1938 normally limits the number of hours that children can work in a day, but has exemptions for those involved in film and television production, leaving it to states to regulate those further. At the time of filming, New Mexico had passed a law to limit children's participation in film and television productions to nine hours a day while Kid Nation was filming, but it did not come into enforcement until a month after filming completed. However, New Mexico had other general child-labor provisions that limited children under 14 to a maximum number of hours per week or day unless previously cleared with the state, which CBS had not appeared to have obtained. Adults were on site with the children but the nature of how the adults supervised the children made it appear that the children were unlawfully engaged in labor under New Mexico law, according to the state. The producers challenged these claims by declaring the set a summer camp rather than a place of employment. This was further questioned by the state, as there are additional rules related to camp operations set by the state that were not followed by production. The ostensible loopholes production had claimed have since been closed.

Health issues were also raised. Parents were required to sign a 22-page waiver that disavowed any responsibility on CBS or production for harm from any medical care given to the children. Forman, ten years after the show's airing, stated that the children were never in any real danger with the amount of adult supervision present, but that the length and terms of the waiver were meant to try to cover all the possible ways they believed that injury could possibly befall the children during production at that location. After 11-year-old Divad Miles was burned when grease splattered onto her face while cooking a meal, her mother, Janis Miles, filed a complaint in June calling for an investigation into "abusive acts to minors and possible violations of child labor laws." The claim was investigated by Santa Fe County Sheriff's Office, which found no criminal wrongdoing on the part of the production company. Other investigative efforts by the state of New Mexico into the Kid Nation production were later dropped. The state's Attorney General's Office cited the lack of formal complaint or request for inquiry from any state agency. The state's Department of Workforce Solutions dropped its charge that the producers had denied inspectors access to the set and said it had no plans to investigate.

The Kid Nation production also raised questions about whether reality show participants are more like subjects in a documentary or working actors. The latter are covered by union rules that govern everything from working hours to compensation. This debate over participant status could be seen in an American Federation of Television and Radio Artists investigation over whether its AFTRA National Code of Fair Practices for Network Television Broadcasting was violated. The investigation went forward even though on reality shows, the Network Code generally covers professional performers, but not the participants. Some parents on hand for the final day of filming accused the producers of feeding children lines, re-casting dialogue and repeating scenes, all of which suggested that the children functioned as actors. Producer Tom Forman said that the parents were observing routine "pickups" for scenes that might have been missed because of technical difficulties.

CBS defended the production's conduct as both legal and ethical, including the response to minor injuries on the set. The network characterized some early allegations as irresponsible, exaggerated or false.

As the children that participated became adults, they began to discuss the show's events in various media outlets, with stories of various praise and concern of the show's production. One of the first such was from Michael who offered a Reddit "Ask Me Anything" in 2014, noting that the show had set out to try to fill various stereotypes with casting. The A.V. Club spoke to several of the participants in 2020, including Laurel, Anjay, and Olivia, confirming some of the stories, and that much of the show as presented on television was more dramatized than actually occurred, setting up certain children like Olivia as a "stock villain", despite this not being the case behind the cameras. There had been a highly-publicized story about one child drinking bleach; Anjay explained in this report that this had been a result of a bottle of bleach being mistaken for a bottle of seltzer water that they had for flavoring drinks in the town store, but medical staff were there immediately to treat the affected child who was returned to the set shortly afterward. Anjay stated that there were over 200 adults near the set at any time, and while he did not consider the show in any way abusive, he did state that "it was definitely a lot more exploitative than I remember it being back then" on watching it as an adult. YouTuber JonTron (Jon Jafari) interviewed Jimmy, the first child to leave the game, in 2020. Jimmy criticized the harsh conditions that the production crew placed upon the children, such as making them cook their own food and wash their own dishes, the poor sanitary conditions (one outhouse for 40 kids and no showers until the first showdown) and the poor sleeping conditions. He also confirmed that on two separate occasions, ambulances were called because one child accidentally consumed bleach from an improperly rinsed container, and the aforementioned Divad Miles burned her face with grease while cooking.

Forman has stated that he would like to return to Kid Nation not so much to produce a sequel, given the amount of difficulty it would take to produce such a work, but more as a "where are they now" type program to follow where the cast has since become as adults.

See also
 Boys and Girls Alone - a British show that attracted similar controversy

References

External links
 Official Kid Nation Site (via Internet Archive)
 

2007 controversies
2007 controversies in the United States
2000s American reality television series
2007 American television series debuts
2007 American television series endings
Television series by Endemol
CBS original programming
English-language television shows
Television controversies in the United States
Television series about children
Television series about teenagers
Television shows filmed in New Mexico